= Alan Manor =

- Location within Gauteng Location within South Africa
- Coordinates: 26°16′39″S 27°59′36″E
- Country: South Africa
- Province: Gauteng
- Municipality: City of Johannesburg
- Main Place: Johannesburg

Area
  - Total: 0.67 km^{2} (0.26 sq mi)

Population (2011)
  - Total: 2,283
  - Density: 3,400/km^{2} (8,800/sq mi)

Racial makeup (2011)
  - Black African: 47.1%
  - Coloured: 19.3%
  - Indian/Asian: 11.1%
  - White: 22.2%
  - Other: 0.3%

First languages (2011)
  - English: 48.9%
  - Zulu: 13.2%
  - Afrikaans: 10.6%
  - Sotho: 6.6%
  - Other: 20.6%
- Time zone: UTC+2 (SAST)
- Postal code (street): 2091

Alan Manor is a suburb of Johannesburg, South Africa. It is located in Region F of the City of Johannesburg Metropolitan Municipality.
